Zakaria Draoui (born February 20, 1994 in Hussein Dey) is an Algerian footballer who plays for Algerian Ligue Professionnelle 1 club CR Belouizdad. He plays primarily as a central midfielder.

On September 27, 2014, Draoui made his  debut with CR Belouizdad as a starter in a league match against MC El Eulma.

Honours
Algeria
FIFA Arab Cup: 2021

References

External links
 

1994 births
Algeria under-23 international footballers
Algerian footballers
Algerian Ligue Professionnelle 1 players
CR Belouizdad players
Living people
People from Hussein Dey (commune)
2015 Africa U-23 Cup of Nations players
RC Kouba players
Footballers at the 2016 Summer Olympics
Olympic footballers of Algeria
Association football midfielders
21st-century Algerian people
Algeria A' international footballers
2022 African Nations Championship players